The 1985 All Japan Endurance Championship was the third season of the All Japan Sports Prototype Championship. The 1985 champion was the #25 Advan Sports Nova Porsche 962C driven by Kunimitsu Takahashi.

Schedule
All races were held in Japan.

Season results
Season results are as follows:

Point Ranking

Drivers

References

External links
 1985 全日本耐久レース選手権 

JSPC seasons
All Japan Endurance
All Japan Endurance